The Voice of Poland (season 1) began airing 3 September 2011 on TVP 2. Based on the reality singing competition The Voice of Holland, the series was created by Dutch television producer John de Mol. It is part of an international series. The series was won by Damian Ukeje, he was coached by judge Nergal. 

This is the only season to feature Kayah, Nergal and Ania Dąbrowska as coaches; they were replaced by Tomson & Baron, Marek Piekarczyk, Justyna Steczkowska and Patrycja Markowska. While Andrzej Piaseczny returned between season six and eight.

Coaches and Hosts

The Voice of Poland began airing 3 September 2011 on TVP 2. The judges were Andrzej Piaseczny, Kayah, Nergal and Ania Dąbrowska. Hubert Urbański and Magdalena Mielcarz hosted the show with Mateusz Szymkowiak as V-Reporter.

Teams
Color key

Blind Auditions 

Color keys

Episode 1 (September 3, 2011)

Episode 2 (September 3, 2011)

Episode 3 (September 10, 2011) 

 Kayah pressed Nergal's button.

Episode 4 (September 10, 2011)

Episode 5 (September 17, 2011)

Episode 6 (September 17, 2011)

Episode 7 (September 24, 2011)

Episode 8 (September 24, 2011)

Episode 9 (October 1, 2011)

Episode 10: The Wildcards (October 1, 2011)

The Battle Rounds 

Color keys

Sing-off
Each coach nominates 4 singers from their group to advance to the live shows. The 2 remaining singers per group will do a sing-off for the remaining live show spot.

Episode 14 (October 22, 2011) 
Color keys

The Live Shows 
Color keys

Episode 15 (October 29, 2011)

Episode 16 (November 5, 2011)

Episode 17 (November 12, 2011)

Episode 18 (November 19, 2011)

Episode 19 (November 26, 2011)

Episode 20: December 3, 2011

Competition Performances

Duets

Finalists' songs

Final: December 10, 2011

Duets

Duets with coaches

Finalists' songs

Results table

Ratings
Source:

References

External links
Official website

The Voice of Poland
2011 Polish television seasons